Susan Larson (born 1944) is an American soprano opera singer and author. Larson was born in New Rochelle, New York and she graduated with a Bachelor of Music from Indiana University in 1965. She received a Master of Music from the New England Conservatory in 1969.

Career highlights
 Charter member, Emmanuel Music, Boston
 Appearances with Santa Fe Chamber Music Festival, Ravinia, St. Louis and Bethlemehm Bach Festivals, Monadnock Music Festival, Pepsico SummerFare Festival, Theater der Welt Festival
 Member, Liederkreis Quartet (Naumburg Foundation Award for chamber music, 1980)
 Peter Sellars production of Mozart's Don Giovanni, Manchester NH 1980, role of Donna Elvira
 Peter Sellars production of Handel's Saul, 1981, role of Michal
 American Repertory Theater, Handel's Orlando, 1982, role of Dorinda
 American Repertory Theater, Rodgers & Hart's The Boys from Syracuse, 1983 (Best Actress in a Musical, Boston Theatre Critics Circle)
 Theater der Welt prize awarded for Sellars' production of Così fan tutte 1989
 Opera Company of Boston, Robert DiDomenica's "The Balcony," (role of Carmen) in Boston and at the Bolsoi in Moscow
 She has published two novels: Sam (a pastoral) and The Murder of Figaro
 Member, Board of Directors, Guerilla Opera

Recordings
 London Records CDs of Così fan tutte (as Fiordiligi), Le nozze di Figaro (as Cherubino), and Giulio Cesare in Egitto as Cleopatra
 Liebeslieder Waltzer (Brahms) with Liederkreis Quartet, "A Samuel Chapter" (John Harbison)
 Emmanuel Music, Schütz motets

Premiere performances
 "Mirabai Songs" (John Harbison)
 "On This Most Voluptuous Night" (Yehudi Wyner)
 Carmen, in Robert DiDomenica's operatic adaptation of Jean Genet's The Balcony, with the Opera Company of Boston (1990).

Filmography
 Le nozze di Figaro (1990) (TV) Cherubino
 Giulio Cesare in Egitto (1990) (TV) Cleopatra
 Così fan tutte (1990) (TV) Fiordiligi

Books
 Sam (a pastoral) (Savvy Press, 2012)
 The Murder of Figaro (Savvy Press, 2019)

Sources
Dyer, Richard. "Susan Larson A Bewitching Contradiction". Boston Globe,  February 5, 1987 
Oestreich, James. "Jean Genet's 'Balcony' Makes Debut as Opera". New York Times, June 17, 1990

References

1944 births
Living people
American operatic sopranos
Musicians from New Rochelle, New York
Indiana University alumni
Classical musicians from New York (state)
21st-century American women